Marian Cecelia Johnson-Thompson (born December 9, 1946) is an American virologist who was a professor at the University of the District of Columbia. She was elected Fellow of the American Association for the Advancement of Science.

Early life and education 
Johnson-Thompson was born in Boston in 1946. She moved to Riviera Beach, Florida as a child, where she attended high school. As an undergraduate student at Howard University, Johnson-Thompson specialized in microbiology, and graduated with a master's degree in 1971. She moved to Georgetown University for her graduate studies, where she focused on molecular virology. Only a few years after segregation, Johnson-Thompson was the first American-born Black person to complete the graduate program. She completed her doctoral research in the Georgetown University Medical Center in 1978.

Research and career 

Johnson-Thompson's research spanned several different aspects of virology. Initially, she studied the mechanisms of action of azacytidine against SV40. She has also investigated the impact of ultraviolet (UV) laser therapy on the stability of viral DNA. She has studied the molecular mechanisms that underpin breast cancer, showing that women of colour were most likely to suffer from environmental-induced breast cancer. This study alerted her to the need for minority sciences to be better represented in medical research.

After retiring from University of the District of Columbia in 1994, Johnson-Thompson joined the National Institutes of Health as the director of education and biomedical research development at the National Institute of Environmental Health Sciences (NIEHS), where she was responsible for clinical trials, including the Sister Study, which looked to understand the environmental causes of breast cancer. She found that African-American women were more likely to have more delayed cancer treatment diagnoses, as well as more prolonged treatment. Johnson-Thompson retired from NIEHS in 2008.

Academic service 
Johnson-Thompson established a scholarship at Howard University which supports women scientists from marginalized groups. The scholarship was named after Marie Taylor. In 1997 Johnson-Thompson established the Bridging Education Science and Technology Program at Hillside High School, introducing high school students to molecular biology.

Awards and honors 
 1975 Outstanding Young Woman of America
 1998 Elected Fellow of the American Academy of Microbiology
 1999 ONI Award from the International Congress of Black Women
 2003 Thurgood Marshall Alumni Award
 2004 Elected Fellow of the American Association for the Advancement of Science
 2004 Appointed Professor Emerita of Biology and Environmental at the University of the District of Columbia
 2004 Appointed adjunct professor in the School of Public Health at the University of NC-Chapel Hill
 2004 American Society for Microbiology Alice C. Evans Award
 2012 Elected to the board of trustees at Howard University
 2018 Appointed vice chair of the North Carolina Environmental Justice and Equity Board

Selected publications

Personal life 
Johnson-Thompson is married with two children.

References 

Living people
American virologists
African-American women scientists
African-American women academics
American women academics
African-American academics
Georgetown University alumni
Howard University alumni
1946 births
21st-century African-American people
20th-century African-American people
20th-century African-American women
21st-century African-American women
American scientists